Nemov is a Russian masculine surname, its feminine counterpart is Nemova. Notable people with the surname include:

 Alexei Nemov (born 1976), Russian gymnast
 Pyotr Nemov (born 1983), Russian footballer

Russian-language surnames